Roxanne "Rocky" Lara is an attorney who formerly served on the Eddy County, New Mexico Commission. Lara ran for Congress in New Mexico's 2nd congressional district in 2014.

Personal life and education
Lara is a native of Carlsbad, New Mexico. She earned a bachelor's degree from New Mexico State University and a JD from Texas Tech. Lara's father was a potash miner, firefighter, oil field worker and Carlsbad school board member.

Career
Lara served as Eddy County Commission Chairwoman. She is also a part of Drexel University's Vision2020, an organization devoted to women's economic and social equality. Lara has also been affiliated with the Energy Communities Alliance, the Carlsbad Chamber of Commerce, and the Eddy County DWI Council. Lara decided against running for another term as Eddy County Commissioner in order to run a campaign to become the chair of the New Mexico Democratic Party; she ultimately lost to Sam Bregman.

Lara ran for Congress in New Mexico's 2nd congressional district in 2014, challenging the incumbent Republican Congressman Steve Pearce. On launching her bid, Lara criticized Pearce's stance on immigration reform and described him as unwilling to work for solutions.

Lara is also a family-law attorney.

References

External links
Campaign site
Twitter account

Living people
New Mexico Democrats
Year of birth missing (living people)